The Jeanneau Yachts 65, also called the Jeanneau 65, is a French blue water  cruising sailboat, that was first built in 2022. The hull was designed by Philippe Briand, the interior by Andrew Winch and finishing by the Jeanneau Design Office.

The design was introduced at the 2022 Cannes Yachting Festival and replaced the Jeanneau Yachts 64 in production.

Production
The design has been built at the Groupe Beneteau shipyard in Monfalcone, Italy, since in 2022 and remained in production in 2023.

Design
The Jeanneau Yachts 65 is a recreational keelboat, built predominantly of fiberglass, with wood trim. It has a vacuum infused hull, with balsa and polyester fiberglass sandwich construction. It has a 9/10 fractional sloop rig with a bowsprit, an over-plumb stem, a reverse transom, with an electrically operated tailgate swimming platform and dinghy garage, an internally mounted spade-type rudder controlled by dual stainless steel leather-covered wheels and a fixed "L"-shaped fin keel with a weighted bulb or optional shoal-draft keel. The fin keel model displaces  empty and carries  of cast iron ballast, while the shoal draft version carries  of ballast.

A solid, hard-top bimini top is an option.

The design has been built with a number of semi-custom interior arrangements. A typical two-cabin interior has sleeping accommodation for four people, with a double island berth in the forward cabin, a "U"-shaped settee and a straight settee in the main cabin and an aft cabin with a double island berth. The galley is located on the port side at the companionway ladder. The galley is "J"-shaped with an island and is equipped with a four-burner stove, a refrigerator/freezer and a double sink. A navigation station is opposite the galley, on the starboard side. There are two heads, one just forward of the bow cabin and one on the starboard side in the aft cabin.

Operational history
The boat is supported by an active class club, the Jeanneau Owners Network.

In a 2022 review for YachtStyle, Geoffroy Langlade wrote, "as with the Jeanneau Yachts 60, the new 65 is elevating the brand’s image as it pushes into the market of semi-custom yachts with a higher level of performance and a sleek, elegant and modern design. The cockpit is particularly user-friendly, and the number of options is large and appeals to owners looking to enjoy long cruises in the company of family and friends."

A 2023 review for YachtHub.com stated, "the Jeanneau 65 yacht is the latest flagship of the Jeanneau Yachts range and offers an unparalleled opportunity to create a true semi- custom yacht from one of the world's largest yacht builders. The new Jeanneau 65 yacht follows the Jeanneau spirit of true seaworthy yachts with brilliant sailing performance comfort and style. A real world cruiser."

A 2023 review for Boats.com stated, "Designed with world-cruising in mind, the Jeanneau Yachts 65 features a powerful and proven hull and is offered with a variety of sail plans and rig options. A key feature of this exciting model which has proven so popular on the Sun Odyssey range is the walk-around deck, enabling easy access when moving fore and aft as well as in and out of the cockpit."

In a 2022 review for YachtClass, Christophe Varène wrote, "Based on the former 64, this new unit reflects its best elements, including a proven hull and an efficient sail plan – conceived as the exterior design by Philippe Briand – yet many changes affect the deck plan for more safety and well-being, both at anchor and at sea, which we experienced during the following hours."

See also
List of sailing boat types

References

External links

Keelboats
2020s sailboat type designs
Sailing yachts
Sailboat type designs by Philippe Briand
Sailboat type designs by Andrew Winch
Sailboat type designs by Jeanneau Design Office
Sailboat types built by Jeanneau